Horrible Histories: Ruthless Romans can refer to:
 A 1998 Horrible Histories book
 A 2008 Horrible Histories exhibition
 A 2009 Horrible Histories stage show